IFPRI may refer to:
International Food Policy Research Institute
International Fine Particle Research Institute